The South Australian Metropolitan Fire Service (SAMFS) is the fire service for metropolitan and urban South Australia, as well as large townships. The Metropolitan Fire Service is constituted under the Fire and Emergency Services Act.

The MFS has 36 fire stations and over 1,000 personnel in Adelaide and across South Australia in major rural centres. It also has one marine vessel.

History 
The South Australian Fire Brigade was formed in 1882, following the passing of the Fire Brigades Act. In 1981 the service was renamed South Australian Metropolitan Fire Service when it became government funded.

Fire Stations

Metropolitan Fire Stations

Regional Fire Stations

Glossary/Callsigns

Appliances 
 1st Pumper: 201 / 281 / 301 / 321 / 331 / 401 / 451 / 501 / 511 / 631 / 641 / 661 / 671 / 681 / 701 / 711 / 721
 2nd Pumper: 202 / 722 / 502
 CAPA (combined aerial pumper appliance): 203 / 243 / 303 / 433 / 523 / 543 / 703
 Technical Rescue: 204
 1st Aerial Platform: 205
 Hazmat & Breathing Apparatus: 206
 Pumper – Hazmat: 217 / 257 / 377 / 417
 4WD Pumper: 528 / 608 / 628
 Pumper – Rescue: 229 / 249 / 319 / 329  / 339 / 359 / 369 / 409 / 429 / 439 / 449 / 469 / 509 / 519 / 529 / 549 / 559 / 609 / 619 / 709 / 719
 Regional Operations Support Appliance: 2814 / 5014 / 5114 / 5214 / 5414 / 6814 / 7014
 2nd Aerial Platform: 2015
 1st Hook Lift: 2017 / 3817 / 5023 / 5417 
 Fire Boat: 2725
 Hazmat Support Unit: 2026
 Water Tanker: 5242 / 6142
 2nd Hook Lift: 2047
 Incident Command Bus: 2090
 Incident Commander: Car20 / Car68
 Incident Command Unit: Car30 / Car40

Pods 

 Salvage (P01)
 1st Flat Bed (P02)
 1st Electricity Generator (P03)
 Hazmat & Breathing Apparatus (P06)
 General Purpose (P08)
 Mass Decontamination System (P09)
 Rehab (P11)
 Heavy Rescue (P12)
 Special Hazmat Support (P13)
 2nd Flat Bed (P32)
 High Volume Hose (P33)
 2nd Electricity Generator (P34)
 Toilet Facility (P35)
 Urban Search & Rescue (P44)
 Bulk Foam (BF)
 Bulk Water Carrier (BWC)
 Emergency Water Purification (EWP)

Trailers 

 Breathing Apparatus Compressor (BAC)
 Bulk Foam (BF)
 Portable Pump (PP)

See also

South Australian Country Fire Service
Australasian Fire and Emergency Service Authorities Council

Notes
Site co-located with the SA Ambulance Service
Replaced Christie Downs Station as of February 2023

References

Emergency services in South Australia
Fire and rescue services of Australia
1981 establishments in Australia
Government agencies of South Australia